Lactuca floridana, commonly known as woodland lettuce, Florida lettuce, or false lettuce is a North American species of wild lettuce. It is native across much of central Canada and the eastern and central United States. 

Lactuca floridana is an annual or biennial plant in the Cichorieae (dandelion) tribe within the Asteraceae (daisy) family. Lactuca floridana was found to contain 11β,13-Dihydro-lactucin-8-O-acetate hemihydrate.

Description
It is usually unbranched with a central stem that is light or reddish green and hairless. It has a pure white, milky sap. The largest leaves are often deeply pinnately lobed, although the leaves in general are variable and can be lobed or unlobed. 

The top of the stem bears a multibranched inflorescence with many flower heads. Each head contains 10–20 blue or white ray florets but no disc florets. The fruit is a brown achene.

Etymology
The genus name Lactuca is based on the Latin word for milk, "lac", and refers to the milky sap. The specific epithet means "of Florida".

Distribution and habitat
L. floridana is native in the United States from Texas to the west, Florida to the south, Massachusetts to the east, and the Canadian border to the north. In Canada it is native in Manitoba and Ontario, although it is possibly extirpated in Manitoba and it's critically imperiled in Ontario. Habitats include disturbed areas, prairies, along roadsides, pastures, and miscellaneous waste areas.

Ecology
The plant blooms from July to October, and the nectar and pollen of the flowers attract bees.

Uses
The plant is edible and can be cooked and eaten as greens.

References

External links
Lady Bird Johnson Wildflower Center, University of Texas
Delaware Wildflowers photos
Alabama Plants photo

floridana
Flora of North America
Plants described in 1753
Taxa named by Carl Linnaeus